Stealth Remixes is an album by Leftfield released on 29 May 2000, originally on Leftfield's official web-site. It was the follow-up to 1999's Rhythm and Stealth and essentially contained remixes of songs from that album. The album was released on CD and double-12". Later, it was released as a double album along with Rhythm and Stealth.

Track listing 
 "Phat Planet (Dave Clarke Remix)" – 5:52
 "El Cid (I-Cube Simple Mix)" – 5:52
 "Rino's Prayer (Nick Rapaccioli Remix)" – 5:39
 "Chant of a Poor Man (Mighty Quark Remix)" – 5:24
 "Dub Gussett (Maas Remix)" – 6:33
 "El Cid (I-Cube Table Tennis Remix)" – 6:49
 "Double Flash (Headstarter Remix)" – 6:11
 "Afrika Shox (CD-Rom Video Version)" – 4:52
 "Dusted (CD-Rom Video Version)" – 4:43

South African/Japanese track listing
 "Afro Ride" – 9:10
 "Original (Live Dub)" – 7:37
 "Filter Fish" – 7:40
 "Afro Central" – 7:43
 "Cut For Life" – 7:02
 "Phat Planet (Dave Clarke Remix)" – 5:52
 "El Cid (I-Cube Simple Mix)" – 5:52
 "Rino's Prayer (Nick Rapaccioli Remix)" – 5:39
 "Chant of a Poor Man (Mighty Quark Remix)" – 5:24
 "Dub Gussett (Maas Remix)" – 6:33
 "Double Flash (Headstarter Remix)" – 6:11

References

Electronica compilation albums
Leftfield albums
2000 remix albums